Alpenrod is an Ortsgemeinde – a community belonging to a Verbandsgemeinde – in the Westerwaldkreis in Rhineland-Palatinate, Germany. The Gräbersberg (513 m above sea level) on the Gemarkung Alpenrod – a rural area attached to the community – is the highest point in the Verbandsgemeinde of Hachenburg, a kind of collective municipality. On the Gräbersberg stands an observation tower with a viewing platform 30 m high and open to the public.

Geography 

The community lies in the Westerwald between Koblenz and Siegen. Flowing through the community is the river Große Nister. Alpenrod belongs to the Verbandsgemeinde of Hachenburg, whose seat is in the town of Hachenburg.

Alpenrod’s Ortsteile are Alpenrod, Hirtscheid and Dehlingen.

History 

Presumed to be the community’s founder is the Vogt (roughly “reeve”) Adalbert von Freusburg. In a document from the year 1320, the village is mentioned for the first time as Albrechtsrode. Here also once stood a castle to guard the ways along the Nichel. However, at least as early as 1131, there had once been a chapel with a small settlement.

The current church’s tower has its roots in this time. Estimates put its beginnings in the 10th century. Alpenrod has two outlying centres, Dehlingen (whose first settler, in 1618, was named Dillinger) and Hirtscheid (meaning “hart border”). Running in the latter by 1551 was a valley mill. Count Salentin Ernst von Manderscheid-Sayn tried more than once (1657; 1678–1680) to get traffic on the Cologne-Frankfurt road – nowadays Bundesstraße 8 – to come through Hachenburg, building a post road which led above Alpenrod, passing by the Neuhof estate, and which is still called the “Post Road” (Poststraße) today. The Cologne-Leipzig road and the Cologne-Frankfurt road were the most important long-distance roads from the time of the Merovingian kings. Since the dale was boggy and not fully passable in the old days, all roadways led over the heights, like the old post road. It is believed that this road was already used in Celtic times.

 population development

Politic 

The municipal council is made up of 17 council members, including the extraofficial mayor (Bürgermeister), who were elected in a municipal election on 13 June 2004.

Economy and infrastructure 

The community lies between Bundesstraßen 255, linking Koblenz and Hachenburg, and 414, leading from Montabaur to Herborn. The A 3 with its Montabaur interchange (AS 40) lies 25 km away. The nearest InterCityExpress stop is the railway station at Montabaur on the Cologne-Frankfurt high-speed rail line.

Buildings 

 Observation tower on the Gräbersberg

External links 
 Alpenrod with its own interactive Internet entry
 Alpenrod in the collective municipality’s Web pages

References 

Municipalities in Rhineland-Palatinate
Westerwaldkreis